Jean-Claude Richard (born 31 January 1946 is a retired French-Swiss football defender and later manager.

Honours

Manager
FC Sion
Swiss Cup: 1994–95

References

1946 births
Living people
French footballers
Racing Besançon players
FC La Chaux-de-Fonds players
Neuchâtel Xamax FCS players
FC Sion players
Association football defenders
Swiss football managers
FC Sion managers